Invisible Empire may refer to:

 Invisible Empire (album), a 2003 album by Reef the Lost Cauze
 "Invisible Empire" (song), a song by KT Tunstall
 Invisible Empire // Crescent Moon, a 2013 album by KT Tunstall
 Invisible Empires, a 2011 album by Sara Groves
 Agent 13: The Invisible Empire, first of the Agent 13: The Midnight Avenger series
 Ku Klux Klan, occasionally referred to as the "Invisible Empire" or "Invisible Empire of the South"
 The Invisible Empire: The Ku Klux Klan in Florida, a book by Michael Newton